Perm National Research Polytechnic University (PNRPU; Russian: Пермский Национальный Исследовательский Политехнический Университет) is a multidisciplinary higher educational institution that provides training for scientific, technical, technological, economic, managerial, social and humanitarian areas and specialties for enterprises and organizations of the Western Ural and Russia. The university is located in the city of Perm, Perm Krai, Russia. Its current rector is Anatoly Таshkinov.

Faculties
 Aerospace Faculty
 Applied Mathematics and Mechanics Faculty
 Car and Road Building Faculty
 Chemical Engineering Faculty
 Civil Engineering Faculty
 Electrical Engineering Faculty
 Humanitarian Faculty
 Mechanical Engineering Faculty
 Mining and Oil Faculty
 Distance Education Faculty
 Staff Advanced Training and Education Faculty

References

Official Site of Perm National Research Polytechnic University

Universities in Russia
Universities and colleges in Perm, Russia
National research universities in Russia
1953 establishments in Russia